Nemam is a village, in East Godavari district in Kakinada, in the state of Andhra Pradesh in India.

References

Villages in East Godavari district